The Duchess of Swabia was the wife of the Duke of Swabia, ruler of the Duchy of Swabia which existed from 915 to 1313 as part of the Kingdom of Germany. If the duke was unmarried there was no duchess. This is a list of holders of the title.

Duchess of Alamannia
 Daughter of Theodo of Bavaria, wife of Duke Gotfrid
 Hereswind, wife of Duke Hnabi

Queen of Alamannia

Carolingian dynasty, 876–882

Duchess of Swabia

Hunfriding dynasty, 909–911

Ahalolfing dynasty, 915–917
None

Hunfriding dynasty, 917–926

Conradine dynasty, 926–949

Ottonian dynasty, 950–954

Hunfriding dynasty, 954–973

Ottonian dynasty, 973–982
None

Conradine dynasty, 982–1012

House of Babenberg, 1012–1038

Salian dynasty, 1038–1045

Ezzonian dynasty, 1045–1047

House of Schweinfurt, 1048–1057

House of Rheinfelden, 1057–1090

House of Zähringen, 1057–1090

House of Hohenstaufen, 1079–1208

House of Welf, 1208–1212

House of Hohenstaufen, 1212–1268

House of Habsburg, 1289–1313

See also
List of Frankish queens
List of German queens
List of Austrian consorts
List of Württembergian consorts

References

Bibliography 
 Heimatverein Waiblingen. Waiblingen in Vergangenheit und Gegenwart, Vols. 4–6.
 Janek, Andreas (2019). Stifts- und Stadwappen von Quedlinburg. Norderstedt.
 Maurer, Helmut (1978). Der Herzog von Schwaben. Thorbecke.
 Schwann, Mathieu (1891). Illustrierte Geschichte von Bayern, Vol. 2. Stuttgart: Süddeutsches Verlags-Institut.
 Vierhaus, Rudolf (2008). Deutsch Biographische Enzyklopädie, 2nd edn. Munich: Saur.
 Zettler, Alfons (2003). Geschichte des Herzogtums Schwaben. Kohlhammer.
 Zotz, Thomas L. (2004). Die deutschen Königspfalzen.  Göttingen: Vandenhoeck & Ruprecht.

External links 
SWABIA

 
Swabia